Mireille "Ballen" Ballestrazzi (born 1954 in Orange, France) is a French law enforcement officer and the former President of the International Criminal Police Organization (INTERPOL).

Education 
Ballestrazzi earned a Bachelors of Art degree in Classics and a master's degree in Greek and Latin. Ballestrazzi graduated from French National Higher Police Academy. Ballestrazzi was a recipient of the Legion d'honneur.

Career 
In 2010, Ballestrazzi was the Vice-President for Europe at the INTERPOL Executive Committee, and Deputy Central Director of the Judicial Police in Paris. In November 2012, Ballestrazzi became the President of International Criminal Police Organization (INTERPOL). Ballestrazzi is the first female President of INTERPOL.

In 2014, in addition to her INTERPOL leadership, Ballestrazzi became the Central Director of the French Judicial Police.

Awards 
 2013 Commander of the Legion of Honour.

References

External links

1954 births
French people of Italian descent
Interpol officials
Recipients of the Legion of Honour
Living people
French police officers